Harikumar  is an Indian actor and director, who has appeared in Tamil films. He is probably best known for his performance in his debut Thoothukudi (2006) and Madurai Sambavam (2009). Moreover, he has appeared as a choreographer in over 100 films.

Filmography

As actor

As choreographer

As director
Theal (2022)

As singer
 "Thealu Thealu"- Theal (2022)

References

Indian male film actors
Tamil male actors
Living people
Male actors in Tamil cinema
Indian choreographers
Year of birth missing (living people)